Greg McLay (born 7 May 1969) is an Australian cricketer. He played six first-class matches for New South Wales in 1990/91.

See also
 List of New South Wales representative cricketers

References

External links
 

1969 births
Living people
Australian cricketers
New South Wales cricketers
Sportspeople from Wagga Wagga